Amanda Enayati  is an Iranian-American author, columnist, and communications strategist best known for her self-help book, Seeking Serenity: The 10 New Rules for Health and Happiness in the Age of Anxiety. She has also contributed to CNN, PBS and Salon.

Seeking Serenity has been well received. Library Journal wrote "while not earth-shattering, provides a positive, inexpensive avenue to inner peace." while The Dunn County News called it a "novel path to serenity". and the Mount Prospect Library found it a "useful guide to creating and maintaining inner peace.".

References

External links 
 Official site

Living people
Iranian women writers
Place of birth missing (living people)
Year of birth missing (living people)